Class is a British science fiction drama programme and a spin-off of the long-running programme Doctor Who. It was created and written by Patrick Ness, who also produced alongside Doctor Who showrunner and lead writer Steven Moffat, and Brian Minchin, who acted as producer on Doctor Who and two of its previous spin-offs, Torchwood and The Sarah Jane Adventures.

The series of eight episodes was released on BBC Three between 22 October and 3 December 2016. The story focuses on five of the students and staff at Coal Hill Academy, a longtime recurrent location of Doctor Who, who are tasked by the Doctor to deal with alien threats while trying to deal with their personal lives.

The series received generally positive reviews from critics, with praise for its darker tone, writing, themes, characters, and acting. However, the series scored poor viewership figures for its broadcast on BBC One. In September 2017, BBC Three confirmed that the series was cancelled.

In 2018 Big Finish Productions produced a series of six Class audio adventures, telling the further adventures of the students at Coal Hill Academy. Six more audio adventures were announced for release starting in April 2020, with two of the main characters being recast.

Premise
The programme is set in Coal Hill Academy, a fictional school that has been featured in Doctor Who since the 1963 serial, An Unearthly Child, and focuses on six of its students and staff members.

The sixth formers of Coal Hill Academy all have their own secrets and desires. They have to deal with the stresses of everyday life, including friends, parents, school work, sex, and sorrow, but also the horrors that come from time travel. The Doctor and his time-travelling have made the walls of space and time stretch thin, and monsters are planning to break through and wreak havoc upon the Earth.

Cast

Main
 Greg Austin as Charlie Smith, an alien posing as a human student. He is the prince of the Rhodians, and the last of his species; after being rescued by the Doctor when his race is slaughtered by another species called the Shadow Kin, he changes his body to a human's and poses as an average 17-year-old student from Sheffield.
 Fady Elsayed as Ram Singh, a tough, antisocial student and gifted football player. After losing his right leg in the first episode, he is given a prosthetic one by the Doctor.
 Sophie Hopkins as April MacLean, an ordinary, unremarkable student whose life is forever changed when she encounters the king of the Shadow Kin, Corakinus.
 Vivian Oparah as Tanya Adeola, a child prodigy of Nigerian origin who moved up three years at Coal Hill School due to her "outstanding examination results" and "truly extraordinary academic capability".
 Katherine Kelly as Miss Andrea Quill, real name Andra'ath, the physics teacher at Coal Hill Academy. Like Charlie, she is secretly an alien and the last of her species, the Quill, long-time war enemies of the Rhodians (who live on a different continent of the same planet). As punishment for her leadership of a war against the Rhodians Quill is psychically linked to Charlie and must act as his protector.

Recurring
 Jordan Renzo as Matteusz Andrzejewski, Charlie's love interest and later boyfriend, born and raised in Poland
 Paul Marc Davis as Corakinus, the evil king of the Shadow Kin
 Pooky Quesnel as Dorothea Ames, the headteacher of Coal Hill Academy from "Co-Owner of a Lonely Heart"
 Shannon Murray as Jackie MacLean, April's mother who lost the use of her legs
 Aaron Neil as Varun Singh, Ram's father
 Natasha Gordon as Vivian Adeola, Tanya's overprotective mother
 Nigel Betts as Francis Armitage, the headteacher of Coal Hill Academy. He previously appeared as a minor character in the Doctor Who episodes "Into the Dalek", "The Caretaker", and "Dark Water".
 Con O'Neill as Huw MacLean, April's father who was pushed away by the rest of the family after he tried to take his own life and theirs in a suicide attempt
 Anna Shaffer as Rachel Chapman, Ram's girlfriend
 Ben Peel as Coach Tom Dawson, Ram's football coach

Notable guest
 Peter Capaldi as The Doctor: The twelfth incarnation

Episodes

Production

Development
The programme was announced on 1 October 2015. Steven Moffat executive-produces the programme. It was revealed on 27 April 2016 that Coal Hill was now an academy. Ed Bazalgette was the first director announced for the series. Philippa Langdale directed two episodes, Wayne Yip also directed a number of episodes for the series, and Julian Holmes directed the finale.

In June 2017, Ness announced that if a second series were to go ahead, he would not be continuing as a writer for the series. On 7 September 2017, BBC Three controller Damian Kavanagh confirmed that the series had been cancelled.

Casting
On 4 April 2016, the main cast of the programme was unveiled. Greg Austin, Fady Elsayed, Sophie Hopkins and Vivian Oparah star as four Sixth Formers, with Austin playing a character named Charlie, while Katherine Kelly portrays Miss Quill, a Coal Hill Academy teacher. Nigel Betts reprises his role as Mr. Armitage from "Into the Dalek", "The Caretaker" and "Dark Water" from the eighth series of Doctor Who. Paul Marc Davis appears in a recurring role in the programme. Anna Shaffer portrays a character named Rachel in the programme.

Patrick Ness revealed on Twitter that one of the lead characters would be a male with a boyfriend. This was eventually revealed to be Charlie, his boyfriend being known as Matteusz. Peter Capaldi, who plays the twelfth incarnation of the Doctor, appears in the opening episode of the programme.

Filming
Class began filming on 4 April 2016. Wayne Yip reported his block finished filming on 16 August 2016. Filming ended on 2 September 2016.

Music
The incidental music for Class is written by composer Blair Mowat. The theme song is a shortened version of "Up All Night" by Alex Clare. The BBC created an official playlist of the songs featured within Class as announced on the BBC Class Twitter page.

Broadcast and release

Broadcast
After being released on BBC Three online from 10am each week in the UK, the episodes also began to be broadcast on BBC One from 9 January 2017. In the United Kingdom, episodes were available digitally in HD shortly after broadcast on the UK iTunes Store. However, the series scored poor viewership figures for its broadcast on BBC One.

In January 2016, the programme was picked up in the US by BBC America, where the programme received its premiere on 15 April 2017, directly after the premiere of the tenth series of Doctor Who.

The programme received its Canadian premiere on 22 October 2016 on Space. In September 2016, the programme was picked up in Australia by the Australian Broadcasting Corporation, where the episodes were fast-tracked from Britain for ABC iview starting on 22 October 2016, and was broadcast later on ABC2 starting on 24 October 2016. In June 2018, Class was added to Netflix in the UK.

Home media release
All eight episodes of Class were released on Blu-ray worldwide, and DVD in Region 2, on 16 January 2017.

Soundtrack

A soundtrack album was released on 7 December 2018. A 500-copies limited edition marbled vinyl edition was released on 4 January 2019. Both CD and LP editions were available with a bonus CD featuring additional score cues.

Track listing

Reception

Ratings summary

Domestically, the series had poorer than expected ratings, failing to make the BBC iPlayer Top 20 in its first seven weeks, and failing to secure over a million viewers at any point when repeated on BBC One in a late-evening slot across January and February. In the US, the premiere pulled in half a million viewers despite running immediately following Doctor Who, losing almost half its forerunner's audience.

Critical response

Despite poor ratings, overall reception from critics for the series was mostly positive. It received praise for its darker tone, writing, themes, and acting, as well as for the overall evolution of the characters during the series; Katherine Kelly and her character Miss Quill, in particular, were singled out. However, the Shadow Kin were considered weak enemies, and the first episodes and finale were criticized for their fast pacing. Reviewers noted that the show was similar to Buffy the Vampire Slayer, with some critics considering it a quality that made it stand out more from Doctor Who, and others being critical of it. Review aggregator website Rotten Tomatoes gives the series an 82% rating based on 17 reviews, with an average rating of 6.9/10.

GamesRadar+ called Class "really, really good. So good, in fact, that even after only two-thirds of its very first season, it’s possible to see the show’s potential bubbling over the sides like an over boiled pot of pasta." Doctor Who TV called Class "a remarkably efficient, seldom-rushed, eight-episode series". Despite being critical of early episodes, IndieWire gave the series as a whole a positive review, stating "while the show knows how to juggle the heavier issues and high-concept scenarios, it doesn’t skimp on the fun." They highly praised Kelly's performance, calling her "fabulous", and the characters of Miss Quill and Matteusz, considering them "absolute scene stealers".

Collider was positive about the series, praising the character of Miss Quill, whom they called "the most consistently delightful part of this series", the fact that the character's adventures were "not easy or without its considerable cost", and its themes of loss and grief, stating "Class is at its best when it slows down and doubles down on the more grounded, relatable struggles of its characters. As is the case with good teen horror dramas that has come before it, Class scariest, most interesting villains aren’t alien monsters that wipe out entire civilizations, but rather the real-world problems like losing a parent, a girlfriend, or losing the time and space to simply be a kid." However, they criticized the show for being too different from Doctor Who, stating "If you’re looking for more of the science fiction idealism that Doctor Who tends to provide, stick to the new season. Here be dragons (sometimes literally) and they will unceremoniously kill people."

The A.V. Club gave a show a B rating, particularly praising the "winning cast of incredibly talented young British actors and its casual diversity, which many contemporary teen shows strive for, but which few pull off so effortlessly." They highly praised the show's representation of homosexual characters, "presented with a refreshing matter-of-factness, not a self-congratulatory pat on the back", the performances (especially Kelly's whom they called a "scene-stealer"), and the characters, stating "There’s not a weak link among the uniformly excellent ensemble and the show serves its teenage characters particularly well by allowing them to have an emotional intelligence that’s not always granted to young protagonists. [...] The most successful parts of the series explore the ways the students support one another through all the weighty challenges they’re faced with, both of the real-world and sci-fi variety. And it weaves in just enough comedy to keep things from becoming too maudlin or too bleak." However, they felt that the science-fiction elements of the series felt out of place: "the extensive exposition needed to introduce the show’s ever-growing mythology starts to sound like someone perpetually reading out the rules for an increasingly complicated adventure board game. As quickly as one element is introduced, more complications are thrown on top of it, leaving the series with little room to breathe."

Entertainment Weekly gave the show a B rating, highly praising the cast: "The young actors are all very talented and have no trouble handling the show’s heavier material. In fact, I found myself wishing there had been more than just eight episodes in the first season because it would’ve been nice to have seen a bit more of the group’s lighthearted side. That being said, the show’s MVP is clearly Kelly, whose Quill not only delivers some of the best lines but also the best arc of the season. Without giving too much away, her dynamic with one of the student leads is the source of some of the season’s most interesting thematic material." However, they regretted that the show's darker tone made it "slightly less fun" than Doctor Who. The Los Angeles Times gave the series a mixed review, stating that Ness' storytelling felt "muddled and mechanical" and "tells you too much, too fast." They however praised that "The female roles are especially strong and well played", particularly praising the performances of Kelly, Sophie Hopkins and Vivian Oparah.

In a post-cancellation review of the series, Morgan Jeffrey of Digital Spy debated the reasons the series was unsuccessful in finding an audience, called the show "the spin-off no-one asked for", and argued that the reason it failed in ratings was due to the BBC not knowing who the show was for: "A teen-oriented drama with adult themes, spun off from a series intended (primarily) for children, the tone of Class was every bit as confused as that muddled origin would suggest." However, and despite having given the show's premiere a mixed review, he stated that "Class wasn't a total write-off. Far from it. The show absolutely had its gripping moments, its standout episodes (the poignant "Nightvisiting" was a clear highlight) – and, oh, what a cast. They'll all be going on to greater things. Most of its problems could've been fixed, if it had done well enough to secure a second series."

Unmade second series
On 21 October 2021, Ness discussed what had been developed for a second series, had Class been renewed. Among the plans were a theme of extreme compromises for the sake of love (with a storyline involving Charlie losing his soul to save Matteusz), a civil war among the Weeping Angels, and the addition of new writers Kim Curran, Juno Dawson and Derek Landy.

Other media

Novels

Audio dramas
Big Finish Productions has produced audio dramas based on Class that take place during the run of the TV series. All of the main cast returns, however, two were recast for Volumes 3 and 4, with Joanna McGibbon playing Tanya Adeola (previously Vivian Oparah) and Dervla Kirwan playing Miss Quill (previously Katherine Kelly).

Volume 1 (2018)

Volume 2 (2018)

Volume 3 (2020)

Volume 4 (2020)

Secret Diary of a Rhodian Prince (2023)

Notes

References

External links
 
 

2010s British drama television series
2010s British science fiction television series
2016 British television series debuts
2016 British television series endings
BBC Cymru Wales television shows
BBC high definition shows
BBC television dramas
British high school television series
2010s British LGBT-related drama television series
English-language television shows
Doctor Who spin-offs
Audio plays based on Doctor Who
Big Finish Productions
Television series about teenagers
Television series by BBC Studios
Television series created by Patrick Ness